General elections were held in Honduras on 24 November 2013. Voters went to the polls to elect a new President, the 128 members of the National Congress, 298 Mayors and vice-mayors and their respective councilors and 20 representatives to the Central American Parliament.

The closely watched presidential election saw a field of eight candidates vying to succeed outgoing President Porfirio Lobo Sosa, who is not eligible to run for re-election. Salvador Nasralla, a sports journalist and television personality, and Xiomara Castro, the wife of the deposed president Mel Zelaya, both candidates from newly formed political parties (the Anti-Corruption Party and Libre, respectively) were leading in most of the early polls. However, as the election neared, the candidates of the two traditional parties – Juan Orlando Hernández of the National Party and Mauricio Villeda of the Liberal Party – both surged in the polls.

Background
This is the first election to be contested by the opposition since the controversial and polarising 2009 Honduran coup d'état. The social mobilization since then led to the founding of the main opposition party, Libre.

Two-party system
Honduras has historically been dominated by a two-party system – the National Party and the Liberal Party. This election represents the first time in Honduran history in which other parties had a chance at winning the presidency or at least gaining a significant representation in the Congress, four of which find their genesis post-coup.

Human rights concerns 
The elections took place amidst a deteriorating human rights situations. Amnesty International called attention to the killings of human rights defenders in the lead-up to the election, noting that Honduras had the highest homicide rate in the world yet only twenty percent of homicides were investigated. Honduran human rights organizations formed the Board of Analysis on the Human Rights Situation to monitor human rights violations surrounding the election, pointing to the level of political violence in the country: human rights group Rights Action examined the period between May 2012 and October 2013 and documented 36 killings and 24 armed attacks against pre-candidates, candidates, their families and campaign leaders across all parties, with Libre experiencing the majority of both armed attacks and killings. In light of this situation, 24 U.S. Senators signed a letter to the U.S. State Department expressing their concerns about the upcoming elections.

Campaign
Key electoral issues have been citizen security, organized crime, unemployment, and corruption. One of the main components of Hernández's campaign is his promise to put "a soldier on every corner." For her part, Castro has emphasized the need for community policing and secure borders.

Presidential candidates

Primaries
Primaries were held for the National Party, Liberal Party and Libre.

National
Juan Orlando Hernández, president of the National Congress of Honduras, won the presidential nomination of the National Party. The other candidates were Ricardo Álvarez (the Mayor of Tegucigalpa), Fernando Anduray (National Congress deputy), Victor Hugo Barnica (Third Vice President of Honduras), Eva Fernandez, Loreley Fernandez, and Miguel Pastor (Secretary of State for Public Works, Transport, and Housing). The Supreme Electoral Tribunal certified Hernández's victory, but Álvarez immediately presented an appeal, accusing Hernández of fraud and asking for a recount. The appeal was rejected by the Constitutional Chamber of the Supreme Court, four of whose five members were replaced by Hernández a month earlier in a move widely criticized as an illegal "technical coup". Álvarez and Pastor refused to attend the party convention in protest, claiming that they were being persecuted by their own party.

Liberal
Mauricio Villeda, won the presidential nomination of the Liberal Party. Other candidates in the fray for the presidential nomination were Esteban Handal Perez and Yani Rosenthal (National Congress deputy and former Minister of Presidency).

Libre
Xiomara Castro de Zelaya, former First Lady of Honduras, was the sole presidential candidate in the Libre primaries.

Opinion polls

President

Congress

Conduct
Honduran elections have historically been marred by fraud, and polls leading up to the elections found that 59% of Hondurans believe the elections would be fraudulent. However, the Supreme Electoral Tribunal (TSE) has stated that these would be the most clean and fair elections in Honduras's history, and both the traditionally dominant parties – the National and Liberal parties – agree. The newly formed Libre Party and Anti-Corruption Party fear that there would be fraud, a position backed by the Carter Center. Anti-Corruption Party candidate Salvador Nasralla publicly denounced attempts at vote-buying by the National Party across the country. Nasralla highlighted National Party control of key government institutions like the Public Ministry and the Supreme Court. Dana Frank, writing in The Nation, echoed these concerns, noting National Party candidate Hernández's participation in both the illegal naming of a new attorney general in August 2013 and the illegal destitution of four Supreme Court judges in December 2012, the latter of which ultimately resulted in Hernández securing his party's nomination for the presidency.

The TSE has stated that over 700 international election observers, representing various governments and organizations, including the United Nations, the Organization of American States, the European Union, and the Carter Center, will be present to monitor the elections. In the days before the election, international observers in the department of Yoro and in the capital Tegucigalpa reported targeted harassment and intimidation on the part of immigration officials and unidentified armed men. The TSE confirmed these reports and ordered the Honduran immigration authorities to stop all of these types of operations concerning election observers.

Results

President

National Congress

Aftermath
Juan Orlando Hernández was announced as the winner in a result the Supreme Electoral Tribunal's head, David Matamoros, called "irreversible", this followed initial claims by both leading candidates of having won. While opposition protests continued, Hernández said the result was "not negotiable with anybody" and named a transition team.

However Castro and Nasralla disputed the results, and Venezuelan president Nicolás Maduro accused the United States of "meddling in the internal affairs of Hondurans." Castro called on her supporters to hold a protest on Saturday 30 November.

According to the North American Congress on Latin America, the elections were "fraught with irregularities and violent intimidation, threatening to throw the embattled nation into further political disarray."  However, observers from the Organization of American States and the United Nations declared that the elections met international standards and were both free and fair.

See also
Parliamentary candidates in the 2013 Honduran general election

References

Honduras
2013 in Honduras
Elections in Honduras
November 2013 events in North America
Presidential elections in Honduras